Referencer is a GNOME application to organize documents or references, and ultimately generate a BibTeX bibliography file. It is designed with the scientist/researcher in mind, and "document" may be taken to mean "paper" in general, although Referencer can deal with any kind of document that BibTeX can. Chief among Referencer's capabilities is the automatic acquisition of bibliographic information (metadata) for some kinds of documents. Upon adding a PDF file to a Referencer library file, it will automatically be searched for key identifiers such as a DOI code or arXiv identifier. If either of these is found, Referencer will attempt to retrieve the metadata for the document via the internet. However, metadata fetching for newer additions to arXiv is broken because of the change of format.

Features
 Smart web links: Referencer uses documents' metadata to provide links to the document's web location
 Import from BibTeX, Reference Manager and EndNote
 Tagging of documents
 Referencer will automatically retrieve arXiv, PubMed and CrossRef metadata for PDF documents which have arXiv ID or DOI code
 Python plugin support: Referencer can be extended using the Python scripting language
 Referencer is translated into many languages

See also
 Comparison of reference management software

References

External links

 https://download.cnet.com/Referencer-for-Linux/3000-20418_4-75219785.html
 https://directory.fsf.org/wiki/Referencer
 ASU diploma
 http://icculus.org/referencer/
 https://www.abisource.com/mailinglists/abiword-dev/2007/Feb/0037.html
 http://icculus.org/pipermail/referencer/2007-August/000175.html
 http://si-referral.ucm.web.id/IT/2921-2810/Referencer_21231_si-referral-ucm.html

Free reference management software
Free BibTeX software
Science software for Linux
Software that uses GTK